Longview Mall is an enclosed shopping mall in Longview, Texas. Opened in 1978, it features Dillard's, JCPenney, Dick's Sporting Goods, Conn's Home Plus, and HomeGoods as its anchor stores.

History
The original anchors of Longview Mall were Sears, Bealls, J. C. Penney, Dillard's, H. J. Wilson Co. (later Service Merchandise), The Martin Twin Theater and Selber Brothers. In 1987, Selber Brothers sold its locations at Longview and Broadway Square Mall to Dillard's, who converted both to separate men's clothing stores.

The Martin Twin was opened May 18, 1978. Each screen had 350 seats. Carmike later operated the theatre as the Mall Twin Cinema until its closing on August 28, 1997. The space is now occupied by Revive Church.

In 2004, Bealls relocated to the former Service Merchandise building. The original Bealls became a miniature golf course.

Dillard's expanded its original store in 2006, resulting in the closure of the menswear store in the former Selber Brothers. The expansion made the 143,000 square foot Dillard's the largest one-story location in the chain. The former Selber Brothers space remained vacant until it became L'Patricia in 2012.

In 2016, a $16 million renovation began at Longview Mall adding stores and amenities. BJ's Brewhouse built a new restaurant in the mall parking lot and On the Border constructed a freestanding restaurant as well.  A Dick's Sporting Goods was constructed (in the original Bealls location). The Bealls has changed to a Stage store.

In February 2017, H&M opened its first East Texas store inside the mall. It is located near the mall's main entrance in the space formerly occupied by Piccadilly Cafeteria which closed in the mid 1990s.

In March 2018 the mall owner bought the Sears store for possible redevelopment in the event Sears closed its store.

On November 8, 2018, Sears announced the closing of this location in February 2019 as part of a plan to close 40 stores nationwide.

On May 31, 2020, it was announced that Stage would also close.

In late 2021 a new store EntertainMART opened in the old Payless Shoes Source location on the front side of the mall beside the Quilt World.

As of February 2022 the old Sears building has been redeveloped into two separate stores, a Conn's Home Plus and a HomeGoods. The L'Patricia store has relocated to the old Stage store location.

References

External links
Official website

Buildings and structures in Gregg County, Texas
Tourist attractions in Gregg County, Texas
Washington Prime Group
Shopping malls in Texas
Shopping malls established in 1978